William Mack "Bill" Hollar, Sr. (September 6, 1938 - November 26, 2012) was a NASCAR Winston Cup Series driver who participated in 29 races out of his nine-year career in NASCAR. He was the son of Mr. and Mrs. Theodore Hollar. Prior to his NASCAR career, he faithfully served in the United States Navy.

Career
While he started his races on an average of 27th place, Hollar has managed to improve his finishing position to an average of 23rd place. Two top-ten finishes were earned at the 1970 Home State 200 and the 1971 Nashville 420. After retiring, Hollar attempted to qualify for the 1987 Holly Farms 400 race but failed to do so.

While Hollar would generally find success on dirt tracks by finishing in 17th place on average, his Achilles heel came on racing track with flat surfaces. He only managed to finish an average of 39th place on that kind of racing surface.

The primary vehicle used by Bill Hollar was the #99 Hollar Auto Parts Chevrolet that was owned by himself.

References

1938 births
2012 deaths
NASCAR drivers
NASCAR team owners
People from Burlington, North Carolina
Racing drivers from North Carolina
United States Navy sailors